Andrew Leon Hanna (born 1991) is an American lawyer, entrepreneur, author, and international human rights advocate. The son of immigrants from Egypt, Hanna was awarded the 2018 Financial Times and McKinsey Bracken Bower Prize for 25 Million Sparks: The Untold Story of Refugee Entrepreneurs. The book, published by Cambridge University Press, tells the stories of three Syrian women entrepreneurs in the Za'atari refugee camp and of refugee entrepreneurs around the world.

Education 
Hanna earned his MBA at Stanford Graduate School of Business, where he was faculty-selected as one of five Siebel Scholars in his class on the basis of academics and leadership, was named an Arjay Miller Scholar for graduating in the top 10% of his class, and was a Stanford Knight-Hennessy Scholar.

Hanna received a J.D. with honors from Harvard Law School, where he was a Harvard Defenders student attorney, Harvard Law Review editor, Harvard African Law Association board member, and recipient of the Oberman Prize for Law and Social Change.

He received a bachelor's degree with honors with highest distinction in public policy from Duke University, where he was senior class president, a Robertson Scholar, a Chapel Scholar, and recipient of the Terry Sanford Leadership Award.

Career 
Hanna is the cofounder of DreamxAmerica, a social enterprise launched at the Harvard Innovation Lab that joins storytelling and impact to highlight and support immigrant, refugee, and first-generation entrepreneurs, including through a partnership with Kiva that has connected small businesses to zero-interest loans during the COVID-19 pandemic. The DreamxAmerica documentary short film premiered in November 2020 in collaboration with PBS Chicago (WTTW), and was nominated for a Chicago Emmy® Award. Hanna previously led the launch of Generation, the global youth employment non-profit founded by McKinsey & Company, in his hometown of Jacksonville, Florida, and founded the national education initiative IGNITE Peer Mentoring.

In 2011, Hanna was one of two American delegates selected by the U.S. State Department to represent the United States at the 7th UNESCO Youth Forum in Paris, France. He was a youth representative to the UN High Level Panel on the Post-2015 Development Agenda's (later adopted by the United Nations General Assembly as the Sustainable Development Goals) meetings with youth in London, U.K. and Bali, Indonesia.

In December 2019, Hanna was named one of Forbes 30 Under 30 in Law and Policy.

Notable works 
Nonfiction
 25 Million Sparks: The Untold Story of Refugee Entrepreneurs (Cambridge University Press, 2022)

Film
 DreamxAmerica (PBS, 2020)

References 

American social activists
American writers
Harvard Law School alumni
Sanford School of Public Policy alumni
Living people
1991 births